Baoulé, also known as Baule or Bawule, is a language spoken in central and southern Ivory Coast, including in the regions of Lacs, Lagunes, Gôh-Djiboua, Sassandra-Marahoué, Vallée du Bandama, Woroba, and Yamoussoukro, by approximately 4.7 million people. It is a Kwa language of the Central Tano branch, forming a dialect continuum with Anyin and closely related to Nzema and Sehwi. It is the common language of the Baoulé people, the largest ethnic group in Ivory Coast.

Translations of the Bible 
In 1946, portions of the Bible translated into Baoulé were first published; the full New Testament followed in 1953. The complete Bible was published first in 1998, by the Bible Society in Abidjan.

Phonology

Consonants

Vowels 

Of these vowels, five may be nasalized: /ĩ/, /ɛ̃/, /ã/, /ũ/, and /ɔ̃/.

Tones 
Baoulé has five tones: high, low, mid, rising, and falling.

Orthography 
Baoulé uses the following letters to indicate the following phonemes:

See also
Akan language
Anyin language

References

Further reading 

 Timyan, Judith E., "A Discourse-Based Grammar of Baule: The Kode Dialect" (1977). CUNY Academic Works. 
 Carteron, Michel. 1972. Étude de la langue baoule. Baconda, Cote d'Ivoire: s.n.

External links
 Baoulé entry at the World Atlas of Language Structures
 PanAfriL10n page on Anyi & Baule
 Baoulé Phonology (French)
 Baule kasahorow

Central Tano languages
Languages of Ivory Coast
Bible versions and translations
Baoulé people